The Leaside Bridge, formerly the East York Leaside Viaduct, and officially commemorated as the Confederation Bridge, spans the Don River in the City of Toronto, Ontario. The Truss bridge carrying Millwood Road was built to connect the then Town of Leaside, including Thorncliffe Park, to the then Township of East York, and was completed on October 29, 1927. The construction time of only 10 months was record breaking at the time.

History 

During the 1920s, as the new communities surrounding Toronto grew rapidly, several bridges were constructed to overcome the barrier of the Don Valley. Among these were the Vale of Avoca (St. Clair Avenue east of Yonge Street) and the East York – Leaside Viaduct. The town of Leaside, built by Canadian Northern Railway in the late teens and early 1920s, sought to attract investors and homebuyers. A connection over the Don Valley to the town of Todmorden Mills and on to Toronto would provide this.

Sod was turned in mid-December and active construction began in January 1927 under the direction of bridge designer Frank Barber. The bridge was rapidly assembled throughout the spring and summer, and inaugurated on October 29 as the Confederation Bridge, in honour of the sixtieth anniversary of that event. The tiled mosaic handrail was designed by New York architect Calude Bragdon with tiles supplied by Italian Mosaic and Tile Company.

In the late 1960s, as the first of numerous plans appeared to extend Leslie Street south of Eglinton, plans were initiated to widen the bridge to support six lanes of traffic. The bridge was closed beginning September 16, 1968, and reopened February 8, 1969. Girders were attached to the sides of the bridge to widen the deck to either side and the piers were reinforced on the corners to carry the additional weight.

Between 2004 and 2006, the bridge was rehabilitated. The second of two contracts to rehabilitate the bridge was awarded in 2005 and included the restoration of the decorative handrail from the original 1927 design.

Facts 
 Engineer: Frank Barber
 Associate architect: Claude Bragdon
 Height: 45.4 metres or 143.8 feet (12½ storeys)

See also 
 Prince Edward Viaduct
 Sewells Road Bridge - another less significant bridge in Toronto designed by Frank Barber
 List of bridges in Canada

References

External links 

Leaside Bridge 
Leaside Bridge Receives Historic Designation 
2004 to 2006 reconstruction
 Leaside Bridge Rehabilitiation Project

Bridges in Toronto
Road bridges in Ontario